John A. Narron, Jr. (born November 13, 1951) is an American professional baseball coach. He is the hitting coach for the Lynchburg Hillcats, the High-A affiliate of the Cleveland Guardians. He is a former hitting coach of the Milwaukee Brewers and former assistant hitting coach of the Texas Rangers of Major League Baseball (MLB). He was a confidant and friend of center fielder Josh Hamilton and temporarily acted as an "accountability partner" to help Hamilton in his recovery from drug addiction.

The native of Goldsboro, North Carolina was a first baseman in the minor league systems of the New York Yankees and Chicago White Sox in 1974 and 1975.

He is the brother of former Rangers and Reds manager Jerry Narron, who served as the bench coach for the Brewers from 2011-2015.  His late uncle Sam Narron was a catcher for the St. Louis Cardinals and a longtime coach with the Pittsburgh Pirates.

Minor League Experience
Narron played for Johnston City, a Rookie affiliate of the New York Yankees during the year of 1974.  He held a career best .272 batting average for Johnston City with 54 RBIs and 15 HRs.  He then went on to play for the low A affiliate of the New York Yankees, Appleton.  Here he posted an .228 batting average with 57 RBIs and 6 HRs.

Coaching career
Narron spent 2007 with the Cincinnati Reds organization as the Reds' Major League Video/Administrative Coach. Narron spent four seasons as a coach in the farm system for the Brewers, including stints as hitting coach and manager at rookie-level Helena Brewers, in 2003, 2004 and 2006.

Narron was Josh Hamilton's off-field coach for five seasons.  He served as an accountability partner for Hamilton, helping him stay free from his addiction to drugs and alcohol.  At age 60, Narron was hoping for a more promising job and that came true in 2012 when Narron was offered the job to become the next Milwaukee Brewers hitting coach.  Hamilton was supportive of Narron in his decision to move on with his career, saying "Johnny is very talented and has helped me tremendously, both personally and professionally. He is fulfilling a dream to be a Major League batting coach, and I have told him previously I would never stand in his way from doing that. We will stay in touch, and I wish him great success with the Brewers." Narron was not retained by the Brewers after the 2014 season and was hired soon thereafter by the Angels organization.

References

External links

Rangers.com coach page

1951 births
Living people
People from Goldsboro, North Carolina
Baseball coaches from North Carolina
Baseball players from North Carolina
Major League Baseball hitting coaches
Cincinnati Reds coaches
Texas Rangers coaches
Milwaukee Brewers coaches
East Carolina Pirates baseball players
Appleton Foxes players
Johnson City Yankees players
Minor league baseball coaches
Minor league baseball managers